The Communication University of China (CUC) is a leading public university in Beijing. It is one of the China's key universities of 'Double First Class University Plan', directly administered by the Ministry of Education of the People's Republic of China. CUC developed from what used to be a training center for technicians of the Central Broadcasting Bureau that was founded in 1954. In April 1959, it was upgraded to the Beijing Broadcasting Institute (BBI) approved by the State Council. In August 2004, BBI was renamed Communication University of China. CUC is located in the eastern part of Beijing near the ancient canal, which occupies 463,700 square meters of land and a total of 499,800 square meters of buildings.

History
CUC's history dates back to March 3, 1954, when the first training class for broadcasting professionals was held by the then Central Radio Administration. This then led to the founding of Beijing Broadcasting College in 1958. On September 7, 1959, CUC's precursor Beijing Broadcasting Institute (BBI) was established.

Confucius Institutes 
Communication University of China has co-established three Confucius Institutes for providing Chinese language and cultural education for learners outside of China.

 Belgrade Confucius Institute (in cooperation with University of Belgrade, Serbia)
 Groningen Confucius Institute (in cooperation with University of Groningen, Hanze University of Applied Sciences Groningen, and the Municipality of Groningen.)
 Confucius Institute at Federal University of Rio Grand Do Sul (in cooperation with the Universidade Federal do Rio Grande do Sul, Brasil)

Modern foreign languages teaching

Communication University of China is one of the officially-sanctioned important base in China for teaching foreign languages and especially narrowly-used languages.  It once offered English, Spanish, French, Russian, German, Japanese, Korean, Portuguese and other language courses.

There is a Center for Portuguese Studies (originally, Centro de Língua Portuguesa Dr. Stanley Ho) under a Cooperation Protocol between CUC, Camões Institute (Portugal) and IPOR (Macau) since 2005.

Rank
Sohu regard Communication University of China as one of the most competitive universities for admission in China.

In September 2017, CUC was selected as one of 140 Double First Class University Plan universities approved by the Ministry of Education.

In the fourth round of China University Subject Rankings (CUSR) by the Chinese Ministry of Education in 2018, Communication University of China ranked first in mainland China with its two disciplinary areas evaluated as A+ disciplines, including "Journalism and Communication" and "Drama, Film and Television Studies" and ranked third with A− in "Art Theory", tenth with B+ in "Design", 19th with B in "Fine Arts" in China.

Notable alumni 
Communication University of China is known for fostering media administrators, producers, journalists and TV presenters in China. Some of its notable alumni include:

Luo Jing, news presenter from China Central Television
Cui Yongyuan, television host from China Central Television
Bi Fujian, television host from China Central Television
Chen Luyu, a Phoenix Television talk show host.
Li Yong, television host from China Central Television
Bai Yansong, news presenter from China Central Television
Chai Jing, former journalist from China Central Television
Chen Luyu, host from Hong Kong's Phoenix Television
Zhang Haijie, news presenter from Singapore's MediaCorp Channel 8
Chen Xiaonan, a Phoenix Television talk show host.
Li Xiang, actress, television host and singer.
Alex Man, Hong Kong actor
Dong Zhen, singer-songwriter
Sandra Ma, television and movie actress
Zining, singer-songwriter, Rocket Girls 101's member
Fu Yaning, singer and actress

References

External links

Campus real three-dimensional map

 
Universities and colleges in Beijing
Film schools in China
Educational institutions established in 1954
Mass media in Beijing
1954 establishments in China
Media studies
Schools in Chaoyang District, Beijing
Plan 111